Southfield Technology College was a secondary school located in Salterbeck, Workington. In 2014, Ofsted put the school into "special measures" following a failed inspection along with Stainburn School and Science College which was also located in Workington. In 2015, the two schools officially closed and formed Workington Academy.

It was announced that the new build would be located at the Stainburn site and it was completed in 2017.

In November 2015 it was announced that the Southfield Technology College site was set to be demolished after a repeated string of vandal attacks on the building. The school has since been demolished and the land remains empty.

References 

Defunct schools in Cumbria
Workington
2015 disestablishments in England
Educational institutions disestablished in 2015